Footprint in the Ocean is a 1964 Soviet adventure film directed by Oleg Nikolayevsky produced by Sverdlovsk Film Studio.

Plot 
A Soviet scientist developed a new scuba gear, which is tested by the best divers in a warship of the Northern Fleet. Western intelligence agencies, in turn, are interested in the unique possibilities of the invention and the scientist’s diaries. And to get them they sent spy in Moscow.

Cast 
 Ada Sheremetyeva
 Yuri Dedovich
 Yevgeny Vesnik
 Daniil Netrebin
 Pavel Makhotin
 Igor Sretensky
 Gennadi Nilov
 Viktor Uralsky

References

External links 
 

1964 films
1960s Russian-language films
Soviet adventure films
1964 adventure films